Michael Francis Flynn (born 1947) is an American science fiction author.

Nearly all of Flynn's work falls under the category of hard science fiction, although  his treatment of it can be unusual since he has applied the rigor of hard science fiction to "softer" sciences such as sociology in works such as In the Country of the Blind.  Much of his short fiction has appeared in Analog Science Fiction and Fact.

Biography
Flynn was born in Easton, Pennsylvania. He earned a B.A. in Mathematics from La Salle University and an M.S. in topology from Marquette University. He has been employed as an industrial quality engineer and statistician.

Bibliography

Awards

Hugo Award Nominations 
 1987 novella Eifelheim
 1988 novella The Forest of Time
 1995 novella Melodies of the Heart
 2005 novelette The Clapping Hands of God
 2007 novelette "Dawn, and Sunset, and the Colours of the Earth"
 2007 novel Eifelheim (based on the 1987 novella)
 2015 novelette "The Journeyman: In the Stone House"

Prometheus Award 
 1991 In the Country of the Blind (won)
 1992 Fallen Angels (won)
 1997 Firestar (nominated)
 1999 Rogue Star (nominated)
 2001 Lodestar (nominated)
 2002 Falling Stars (nominated)
 2009 The January Dancer (nominated)

Other awards 
 Fallen Angels also won the Seiun Award, and was co-written with Larry Niven and Jerry Pournelle.
 The novelette "House of Dreams" won a Theodore Sturgeon Award in 1998.
 The novelette "Quaestiones Super Caelo et Mundo" tied with Kristine Kathryn Rusch's novella "Recovering Apollo 8" for the Sidewise Award for Alternate History in 2007.
 First winner of the Robert A. Heinlein Medal.

References

Sources
Flynn, Michael. The January Dancer; Macmillan, (2008).

External links

REVIEW: The Wreck of the River of Stars
Mike Flynn's blog
Publisher's page on Author

1947 births
Living people
20th-century American novelists
20th-century American short story writers
20th-century American male writers
21st-century American novelists
21st-century American short story writers
21st-century American male writers
American male novelists
American male short story writers
American science fiction writers
Analog Science Fiction and Fact people
La Salle University alumni
Marquette University alumni
Novelists from Pennsylvania
Sidewise Award winners
Writers from Easton, Pennsylvania